The 2019 FIBA U20 European Championship was the 22nd edition of the FIBA U20 European Championship. The competition took place in Tel Aviv, Israel from 13 to 21 July 2019.

Participating teams 
 
 
 
 
 
 
 
   (3rd place, 2018 FIBA U20 European Championship Division B)
 
 
   (Winners, 2018 FIBA U20 European Championship Division B)
 
   (Runners-up, 2018 FIBA U20 European Championship Division B)

Venues

First round 
In this round, the 16 teams are allocated in four groups of four teams each. All teams advance to the Second Round of 16.

All times are local (UTC+3).

Group A

Group B

Group C

Group D

Final round

Championship bracket

Round of 16

Quarterfinals

Semifinals

3rd place game

Final

5th–8th place bracket

9th–16th place bracket

Final standings

Awards

Most Valuable Player

All-Tournament Team
  Philipp Herkenhoff
  Sergi Martínez Costa
  Deni Avdija
  Yam Madar
  Carlos Alocén

See also
2019 FIBA U20 European Championship Division B

References

External links
 FIBA official website

FIBA U20 European Championship
2019–20 in European basketball
2019–20 in Israeli basketball
2019 in youth sport
2019 in Israeli sport
International youth basketball competitions hosted by Israel
Sports competitions in Tel Aviv
July 2019 sports events in Europe
2010s in Tel Aviv